The men's +109 kg competition of the weightlifting events at the 2019 Pan American Games in Lima, Peru, was held on July 30 at the Coliseo Mariscal Caceres.

Results
5 athletes from five countries took part.

References

External links
Results

Weightlifting at the 2019 Pan American Games